Quesnel Lake  is a glacial lake or fjord in British Columbia, Canada, and is the major tributary of the Fraser River.

On August 4, 2014, the tailings pond of Mount Polley mine burst, spilling tailings into Polley Lake and Quesnel Lake and temporarily depriving residents of Likely, British Columbia, of fresh water for household use. In 2017, the Mount Polley mine was granted a permit to discharge mine wastewater into Quesnel Lake.

Forestry, mining and fishing are popular in this area. Quesnel Lake is also a trophy lake because live bait or barbed hooks are not allowed. Catch-and-release restrictions apply to Steelhead fish shorter than 10 cm or longer than 50 cm. Rainbow trout, Dolly Varden and other species of lake trouts are common. Fish habitats established in Hazeltine creek are supporting the trout population in local waterways include in Quesnel lake. Quesnel lake offers the ability to fish right from shore and along tributary streams, or to explore the lake by boat, kayak, canoe, or paddleboard during the summer months.

References

Sources
 
 

Lakes of the Cariboo
Glacial lakes of Canada
Cariboo Land District